Rene Bouscat was a French Air Force officer and general.

Chief of Staff of French Aerial Forces in July 1943, he merged the Free French Air Forces with the Vichy French Air Force. René Bouscat was a Général d'Armée Aérienne and Chief of Staff of the French Air Force from July 1, 1943, until October 30, 1944, and then from February 28, 1946, until September 6, 1946.

French military personnel
French Air Force generals
Chiefs of the Staff of the French Air and Space Force